Great Yarmouth Friary may refer to:

Great Yarmouth Black Friary (Dominican)
Great Yarmouth Grey Friary (Franciscan Friars Minor, Conventual)
Great Yarmouth Carmelite Friary (White Friars)